Anthony Elliott-Kelly FAcSS or Anthony Kelly, better known as Tony Kelly, is an Irish academic who is currently Professor of Education (and former Head of Department) at the University of Southampton, England.

Education and career
Kelly got a degree from the National University of Ireland and also attended Queens' College, Cambridge and Trinity College, Cambridge (on a scholarship).

He previously worked at the University of Cambridge with Mel West, and before that was a headteacher in Ireland. His background is in applied mathematics and theoretical physics, which he studied at Cambridge under George Batchelor. He is a fellow of the Institute of Physics and of the Institute of Mathematics and its Applications, organizations devoted to improving education and research.  In 2013 he was elected as an Academician of the Academy of Social Sciences. He was a leading figure in the movement to integrate and rationalise education in the Irish border region where he developed new governance structures.

Kelly was well known in Ireland because of his work in merging schools with different traditions, and is known in UK university circles for his traditional view of the role of universities. As a student at Cambridge he famously cast doubt on the sincerity of a student discussion (on Irish politics) in a student society, the Cambridge Apostles, causing some offence.

Kelly was founding editor of the journal Education, Knowledge and Economy, serves on the editorial board of other international academic journals, and is an invited lecturer at several leading universities outside the UK. He serves on several national UK steering groups and approval panels, and has appeared before the House of Commons Select Committee on Education. He served on the REF2014 panel for Education, UoA25. He also retains an interest and involvement in Anglo-Irish affairs. He is the author of approximately one hundred research reports, books and papers in leading academic journals.

Works
His books include:
Benchmarking for School Improvement: A Practical Guide for Comparing & Improving Effectiveness. London, Routledge Falmer, 2001.
Decision-making through Game Theory. Cambridge, Cambridge University Press, 2003.
The Intellectual Capital of Schools: Measuring and managing knowledge, responsibility and reward: Lessons from the commercial sector. Dordrecht, New York & London, Kluwer Academic Press, 2004.
School Choice and Student Well-being: opportunity and capability in education. London, Palgrave Macmillan, 2007.
Using Effectiveness Data for School Improvement: developing and utilising metrics. London, Routledge, 2011. [with Downey, Christopher]
 Developing metrics for equity, diversity and competition: new measures for schools and universities. London, Routledge, 2016.
 Dynamic Management and Leadership in Education: high reliability techniques for schools, colleges and universities. London, Routledge, 2021.

References

External links
 Profile at southampton.ac.uk

Living people
Irish educational theorists
Academics of the University of Southampton
Fellows of the Institute of Physics
Alumni of Trinity College, Cambridge
Academics of the University of Cambridge
Alumni of Queens' College, Cambridge
Alumni of the University of Edinburgh
Alumni of the University of Hull
Fellows of the Institute of Mathematics and its Applications
Fellows of the Academy of Social Sciences
Year of birth missing (living people)